Yesterday & Today Volume 1 is a compilation album by the progressive bluegrass band Country Gentlemen.

Track listing

 Are You Waiting Just For Me (Ernest Tubb)
 The Fields Have Turned Brown (John Duffey)
 Tom Dooley (Frank Proffitt)
 Less of Me 
 Long Black Veil (Danny Dill, Marijohn Wilkin)
 When They Ring Those Golden Bells (Traditional)
 I Never Will Marry (Traditional)
 Electricity 
 Under the Double Eagle (Josef Wagner)
 California Blues (Blue Yodel No 4) (Jimmie Rodgers)
 Get in Line Brother  
 Mrs. Robinson (Paul Simon)

Personnel
 Charlie Waller - guitar, vocals
 Doyle Lawson - mandolin, vocals
 Bill Emerson - banjo, vocals
 Bill Yates - bass, vocals

References

External links
 http://www.lpdiscography.com/c/Cgentlemen/cgent.htm

The Country Gentlemen compilation albums
1973 compilation albums
Rebel Records compilation albums